Muriel Williams Battle High School (commonly Battle) is a public high school in Columbia, Missouri, United States. It opened for summer school on June 3, 2013, and started its first school year in August 2013. The school serves students in grades 9–12, however seniors did not attend the first year of operation. It is one of four public high schools in the Columbia Public Schools district.

Former NFL defensive linebacker, Atiyyah Ellison, worked here as a football coach.

History 

Columbia's population growth was well over 20% between the 2000 and 2010 censuses. Because of this rapid growth, the city passed a 120 million dollar bond issue in April 2010, partially to fund a new high school, which would later become Battle.

Athletics 
The following sports are offered to students at Battle:

 Baseball (spring season)
 Basketball (boys and girls)
 Cross country (boys and girls)
 Cheerleading 
 Football (11 man)
 Golf (boys and girls)
 Softball (fall season)
 Soccer (boys and girls)
 Swimming & diving (boys and girls)
 Tennis (boys and girls)
 Track & field (boys and girls)
 Volleyball (girls)
 Wrestling (boys and girls)

Performing arts 
Battle has four choirs. The mixed-gender "Battalion" functions as both a concert choir and a competitive show choir. "Apollo" is a concert choir for tenor/bass voices, and "Siren Sound" and "Voices of Sparta" are concert treble choirs. The program also hosts its own competition every year, BattleFest.

References

External links 
 

High schools in Columbia, Missouri
High schools in Boone County, Missouri
Public high schools in Missouri
Educational institutions established in 2013
2013 establishments in Missouri